Jaspillite, or jaspilite also itabirite, is a chemical rock formed similar to chert, but is generally quite iron rich. It is also known as jasper taconite. Jaspillite is typically a banded mixture of hematite and quartz common in the banded iron formation rocks of Proterozoic and Archaean age in the Canadian shield.

Jaspillite is also formed as exhalative chemical sediments in certain lead-zinc ore deposits, and as a hydrothermal alteration facies around submarine volcanism.

It is used as a gemstone.

References

Jaspillite and Taconite etymology
Mindat.org data
Rob Kanen, 2001, The Hamerseley Basin

Sedimentary rocks
Chert
Quartz gemstones